Avicennite (thallium(III) oxide) is an oxide mineral. It was discovered around the Dzhuzumli village, Samarqand, Uzbekistan. It is named after Avicenna, a Persian doctor and polymath.

See also
List of minerals
List of minerals named after people

References 

Thallium minerals
Oxide minerals
Cubic minerals
Minerals in space group 206